Anna Stratton is a Canadian film and television producer and actress. Her projects include the feature films Zero Patience (1993), Lilies, for which she won a 1996 Genie Award for Best Motion Picture, and Emotional Arithmetic (2007). Her work in television includes the children's program L'Histoire de l'Oie.

 Biography 
Anna Stratton is a graduate of the Canadian Film Centre and has a background in the theatre, where she worked as a producer, administrator and educator and as Head of English Language Theatre for the Canada Council. She produced many stage productions, including the hit play, Tamara. Anna has served on many boards and committees including the Feature Film Project of the Canadian Film Centre, Dance Umbrella of Ontario, the First Night Festival and the Toronto Theatre Festival. She is a co-founder of Reel Canada, the festival of films for high schools, the Producer's Roundtable of Ontario and serves on the OMDC advisory group for screen-based industries.

One of the founders of Toronto-based Triptych Media in 1994, Anna and partner Robin Cass bring together their backgrounds in the theatre and visual arts to develop film and television entertainment. The company's slate runs the gamut from comedy to drama, with properties chosen for the strength of their characters, story-telling and social relevance. Triptych is best known for the features Falling Angels, The Republic of Love, The Hanging Garden, Lilies and the ground-breaking Zero Patience as well as for its television dramas Lucky Girl, The Tale of Teeka (French title: L'Histoire de L'Oie) and Gordon Pinsent's Heyday! The company is an active co-production partner internationally.

Triptych's latest films are Gary Yates' feature High Life, based on the hit play by Lee MacDougall; Emotional Arithmetic, based on the novel by the late Matt Cohen, directed by Paolo Barzman and starring Susan Sarandon, Christopher Plummer, Gabriel Byrne, Roy Dupuis and Max von Sydow. Triptych is executive producer on Richie Mehta's feature debut, Amal and on the documentary As Slow as Possible by Scott Smith.

 Filmography 
 The Girl King (2015) (producer)
 High Life (2009) (executive producer)                                                             
 Emotional Arithmetic (2007) (producer) (Autumn Hearts: A New Beginning in U.S.)                                                    
 Heyday! (2006) (TV) (producer)                                                           
 The Republic of Love (2003) (producer)                                                        
 The Bay of Love and Sorrows (2002) (producer) (Baie de l'amour et des regrets, La, French title in Canada)                                  
 The Bookfair Murders (2000) (TV) (executive producer) (producer)                              
 L'Histoire de l'Oie (1998) (TV) (executive producer) (The Tale of Teeka in Canada)                                                  
 Lilies - Les feluettes (1996) (producer) (Lilies, short and French title in Canada)                                             
 Zero Patience'' (1993) (producer)

References

External links
 
 Triptych Media Inc.

Film producers from Ontario
Canadian television producers
Canadian women television producers
Canadian Screen Award winners
Living people
Canadian theatre managers and producers
Women theatre managers and producers
Canadian women film producers
Year of birth missing (living people)